Weaver Creek is a creek located in the East Kootenay region of British Columbia.  Weaver Creek is a tributary of the Moyie River.  The creek has been mined for gold.

References

Rivers of British Columbia
East Kootenay
Purcell Mountains